Snowboarding at the 2023 Winter World University Games was held at Gore Mountain from 12 to 22 January 2023.

Men's events

Women's events

Medal table

Participating nations
26 nations participated.

  (1)
  (1)
  (2)
  (5)
  (1)
  (8)
  (8)
  (8)
  (1)
  (11)
  (6)
  (1)
  (1)
  (14)
  (2)
  (1)
  (1)
  (7)
  (1)
  (1)
  (10)
  (7)
  (1)
  (6)
  (8)
  (5)

References

External links
Snowboard lakeplacid2023.com
Results book

2023 Winter World University Games
 
Winter World University Games
2023